The 2011–2012 St. Francis Terriers men's basketball team represented St. Francis College during the 2011–12 NCAA Division I men's basketball season. The team is coached by Glenn Braica, who is in his second year at the helm of the St. Francis Terriers. The Terrier's home games are played at the  Generoso Pope Athletic Complex. The team has been a member of the Northeast Conference since 1981. They finished the season at 15–15 overall and 12–6 in NEC play to finish in fourth place. The Terriers went on to lose in the quarterfinals of the Northeast Conference Basketball tournament to Quinnipiac.

Braica was awarded the NEC Jim Phelan coach of the year award and freshman forward Jalen Cannon was selected to the NEC All-Rookie team. Ben Mockford led the Terriers in scoring with 11.8 points per game, Jalen Cannon led the team in rebounding with 8.8 per game and Brent Jones paced the team with 3.9 assists per game.

Season outlook
Going into Glenn Braica's second year as head coach, the Terriers were looking to build on the previous years success and get beyond the NEC quarter-finals. Although, the Terriers lost several key pieces to their team via graduation, including St. Francis College all-time leading scorer, Ricky Cadell, and Akeem Bennett. These losses led in part to their NEC coaches preseason poll selection to finish 11th.

Recruiting
6' 6" power forward Lowell Ulmer, 6' 5” guard Kevin Douglas and 6' 6” power forward Jalen Cannon were signed in the spring.

Regular season
The Terriers had a difficult schedule with their first 9 games on the road. To begin the year, the Terriers lost 3 close games to Seton Hall, Lafayette and Hofstra. In the season opener the Terriers were leading 62–60 with 0:09 left, yet they gave up the lead and lost in overtime 71–75. Against Lafayette, the Terriers were tied 69–69 with just 1:33 left, but were unable to pull out the victory. Versus Hofstra, the game was tied 9 times and there were 12 lead changes as the game went down to the wire. In the fourth contest of the season the Terriers were soundly defeated by the Red Storm. Against NJIT, the Terriers picked up their first win of the season behind a 22-point performance by Ben Mockford. Then in their first conference game, the Terriers rode Mockford's 19 points to beat the Mountaineers and win their second game of the season. After their 2-game winning streak, the Terriers lost to the surging Wagner Seahawks, which went on to defeat 13th ranked Pittsburgh. The Terriers next faced Colgate, a team that has never beaten them before (4–0), and loss a close contest 63–65. Then, after being on the losing end of buzzer-beaters and last minute runs, the Terriers pulled out a win in the final minute of the game at Howard.

The Terriers then began a 3-game homestand at the Pope, where they lost their first 2 to Albany and Norfolk State. In their final game of the homestand the Terriers won their first home game against Brown. The Terriers then went on the road against Army where they faltered ending the non-conference portion of the schedule and finishing 3–7 against non-conference opponents. The Terriers then got hot and won 9 out of their next 10 games against conference opponents. Their only loss was to Wagner, which swept the season series, 0–2. Heading into Rivalry Week the Terriers were set to play 2 matches against LIU and at stake was 1st place in the NEC. Yet the Terriers were swept, losing both games, including the Battle of Brooklyn ending their hopes of a regular season championship. The Terriers then bounced back and beat Quinnipiac on the road, taking the season series 2–0 and clinching a NEC Tournament spot with 3 games left to play. They then went on to go 1–2 beating Sacred Heart and losing to Monmouth and Farleigh Dickinson; both loses came on the road. One high note came in the last game of the regular season, when freshman Jalen Cannon grabbed 20 rebounds against Farleigh Dickinson, which was the most by a Division I freshman in the entire country last season.

The Terriers were able to get the 4th seed going into the NEC tournament. They will host their first home playoff game since 1997. Additionally, coach Glenn Braica won the NEC Jim Phelan coach of the year award and Jalen Cannon was selected to the NEC All-Rookie team.

NEC tournament
The Terriers clinched the 4th seed in the Northeast Conference tournament and faced 5th seed Quinnipiac at home. The Terriers made a quick exit from the tournament losing to Quinnipiac 72–80 in the first round of play.

Roster

Schedule and results

|-
!colspan=12 style=| Regular Season

|-
!colspan=9 style=| NEC tournament

Season Statistics

Signings
The Terriers announced that 6' 3” combo guard Anthony White (Mastic, NY) and 6' 4” shooting guard Aleksandar Isailovic (Belgrade/Serbia) have signed National Letters-of-Intent to enroll at the college fall 2012.

References

External links
 St. Francis Terriers men's basketball official website

St. Francis Brooklyn Terriers men's basketball seasons
St. Francis
St. Francis Terriers men's b
St. Francis Terriers men's b